This article is about the composition of the Regional Council of Veneto, the legislative assembly of Veneto, during the VIII Legislature, thus the term started in April 2005, following the 2005 regional election, and ended in April 2010. Of the 60 members, 47 were elected in provincial constituencies with proportional representation with a further 12 returned from the so-called "regional list" of the elected President of Veneto, including the President himself, and the candidate for president who came second.

Marino Finozzi (Liga Veneta) was President of the Council for the entire term, while Giancarlo Galan (Forza Italia, later The People of Freedom) served as President of Veneto at the head of his third government.

Composition
Thirteen parties were represented in the Council at the beginning of the term. They became fourteen when Massimo Carraro, the defeated candidate for President of the centre-left, resigned and was replaced by a regional deputy elected from the list of Italy of Values, thanks to an obscure clause of the electoral law.

The single largest party in the Council was Forza Italia, followed by Liga Veneta until February 2007, when the members of Democracy is Freedom – The Daisy (7 regional deputies) and the Democrats of the Left (5 regional deputies) formed a joint-group, the "Olive Tree – Venetian Democratic Party", named after the future Italian Democratic Party, which was founded later in October. It was the first time in Italy that the name of the future party was used in an institutional contest.

Strength of political groups
Sources: Regional Council of Veneto – Groups and Regional Council of Veneto – Members

Members by party of election

Forza Italia
Raffaele Bazzoni
Regina Bertipaglia
Dario Bond
Renato Chisso
Giancarlo Conta
Barbara Degani (resigned on 30 June 2009)
Giuliana Fontanella
Elisabetta Gardini (resigned on 13 July 2006)
Giancarlo Galan
Fabio Gava (resigned on 24 June 2008)
Amedeo Gerolimetto (installed on 26 June 2008)
Raffaele Grazia (switched to "Veneto for EPP")
Renzo Marangon
Renato Martin (installed on 15 July 2009)
Vittoriano Mazzon (installed on 15 July 2009)
Leonardo Padrin (installed on 17 March 2006)
Clodovaldo Ruffato
Remo Sernagiotto
Carlo Alberto Tesserin
Tiziano Zigiotto

Liga Veneta–Lega Nord
Andrea Astolfi (resigned on 27 July 2006)
Luca Baggio (installed on 23 July 2009)
Mara Bizzotto (installed on 13 July 2006, resigned on 3 August 2009)
Gianpaolo Bottacin (resigned on 10 July 2009)
Federico Caner
Vittorino Cenci (installed on 28 June 2007)
Roberto Ciambetti
Maurizio Conte
Gianantonio Da Re (resigned on 20 July 2009)
Marino Finozzi
Franco Manzato
Claudio Meggiolaro (installed on 2 September 2009)
Sandro Sandri (resigned on 7 August 2006)
Daniele Stival
Flavio Tosi (resigned on 25 June 2007)
Emilio Zamboni (installed on 14 September 2006)

Democracy is Freedom – The Daisy
(The group was merged into "The Olive Tree – Venetian Democratic Party")
Giuseppe Berlato Sella
Diego Bottacin
Gustavo Franchetto (switched to "Italy of Values")
Franco Frigo
Igino Michieletto
Guido Trento
Achille Variati (resigned on 6 May 2008)

National Alliance
Maria Luisa Coppola
Piergiorgio Cortelazzo
Elena Donazzan
Massimo Giorgetti
Moreno Teso
Raffaele Zanon

Union of Christian and Centre Democrats
Iles Braghetto (installed on 14 September 2006, resigned on 10 October 2006)
Onorio De Boni
Antonio De Poli (resigned on 20 July 2006)
Flavio Frasson (installed on 25 October 2006)
Francesco Piccolo (switched to the "Venetian People's Movement")
Flavio Silvestrin
Stefano Valdegamberi

Democrats of the Left
(The group was merged into "The Olive Tree – Venetian Democratic Party")
Carlo Alberto Azzi
Franco Bonfante
Giovanni Gallo
Giampietro Marchese
Claudio Rizzato (installed on 4 June 2008)
Luciano Tiozzo

North-East Project
Diego Cancian (switched to the "Forum of Venetians")
Mariangelo Foggiato

For Veneto with Carraro
Andrea Causin (switched to "Democracy is Freedom – The Daisy")
Marco Zabotti

United for Carraro
Massimo Carraro (resigned on 7 September 2006)

Communist Refoundation Party
Pietrangelo Pettenò

Federation of the Greens
Gianfranco Bettin

New Italian Socialist Party
Nereo Laroni

Italian Democratic Socialists
Carlo Covi (switched to "Venetian Agreement")

Party of Italian Communists
Nicola Atalmi

Italy of Values
Damiano Rossato (installed on 14 September 2006)

Election

The regional election that produced the VIII Legislature took place on 3–4 April 2005. Giancarlo Galan (Forza Italia, House of Freedoms) was re-elected for the third time president of the region, but the support for him was diminished by the presence of a third candidate, Giorgio Panto, who picked votes both from the centre-right camp and from the Ventist one, and of a fourth candidate of the far-right.

Forza Italia suffered a decline in term of votes and regional deputies, although remaining the largest party in the council and also in the region as a whole (the Olive Tree was only an electoral alliance at the time and the three parties which were part of it formed separate groups in the council), while Venetist parties had a very good result: the combined score of Liga Veneta (14.7%), North-East Project (5.4%) and Liga Fronte Veneto (1.2%) was 21.3%, up from the 15.6% of 2000 (Liga Veneta 12.0%, Veneti d'Europa 2.4% and Fronte Marco Polo 1.2%.

References

Veneto,2005
2005
Regional Council,2005